CBS 8 may refer to one of the following television stations in the United States:
KCCI, Des Moines, Iowa
KFMB-TV, San Diego, California
KIFI-DT2, a digital channel of KIFI-TV in Idaho Falls, Idaho
KLAS-TV, Las Vegas, Nevada
KLST, San Angelo, Texas
KNOE-TV, Monroe, Louisiana
KPAX-TV, Missoula, Montana
KUAM-DT2, a digital channel of KUAM-TV in Hagåtña, Guam
WAKA (TV), Montgomery, Alabama (licensed to Selma)
WAGM-TV, Presque Isle, Maine
WKBT-DT, La Crosse, Wisconsin
WROC-TV, Rochester, New York
WVLT-TV, Knoxville, Tennessee

Formerly affiliated
WCHS-TV, Charleston, West Virginia (1954 to 1958 and 1962 to 1986)
WHOI, Peoria, Illinois (1953 to 1957; now on channel 19)
WISH-TV, Indianapolis (1956 to 2014)
WJW, Cleveland, Ohio (1955 to 1994)